The San Francisco Baking Institute (SFBI) is a private, unaccredited culinary school in South San Francisco, California founded by Michel Suas and his wife Evelyne Suas in 1996.  The school hosts bread and pastry classes for professional and amateur bakers, as well as baking instructors.

History and founding
Suas began baking at age 14 in Brittany, France.  At age 21 he became head pastry chef at Barrier, a Michelin Guide three-star restaurant in Tours, France.  Several years later Suas and his wife immigrated to the United States and toured the country in a Volkswagen van, ending up in San Francisco in 1987, which was in the midst of a "bread revolution".  He soon began consulting with for the city's new artisan bakeries.  Acme Bread was his first client, and La Brea Bakery was his second, followed by many others throughout the United States including Metropolis, Grace Baking, Boudin Bakery, and Thomas Keller's restaurants.

In 1996 Suas opened the Institute in South San Francisco.

Operations
The San Francisco Baking Institute (SFBI) offers short workshops (2-5 day seminars on specific topics) as well as an 18-week full-time and 24-week part-time Bread & Pastry Professional Training Program.  Enrollment is typically approximately 30 students at a given time: 16 in bread classes and 12-16 in pastry classes.

Since 2001, the Institute has worked with the Bread Project to train low-income students for bakery careers.

In 2005 the Institute was the training center for the American team that won the Coupe du Monde de la Boulangerie, a world championship for bakers held every three years at Europain, a bread exhibition in Paris, France.

Related businesses
Soon after opening the Institute, Michel Suas also founded an equipment importer, TMB Baking, and a retail bakery, Thorough Bread and Pastry, that sells food made by professional bakers who have graduated from the school's professional training program or internship.

In 2012, Suas partnered with Belinda Leong to open B.Patisserie in San Francisco.

The Institute trained Armando Lacayo, owner of the Arsicault Bakery in San Francisco, which Bon Appétit magazine named America's best new bakery in 2016.

Awards
In 2002, the Bread Bakers Guild of America awarded Suas its Golden Baguette in recognition of his contributions to the artisan baking industry. In 2018, Suas won the James Beard Foundation Award for Outstanding Baker, sharing the honor with his partner at B.Patisserie, Belinda Leong.

Bibliography

References

External links
sfbi.com - official website

Educational institutions established in 1996
Cooking schools in the United States
Baking industry
1996 establishments in California